Capula Investment Management LLP is a British hedge fund, the fourth largest in Europe, with assets under management (AUM) of about $23 billion as of H2 2020.

Location
It is headquartered at 7 Clarges Street, in Mayfair, London with affiliated entities in Hong Kong, Japan, Singapore and the US.

History
It was founded in 2005 by Yan Huo and Masao Asai, as a spin-off from Mitsubishi UFJ Securities International.

Organization
The firm manages absolute return, enhanced fixed income, macro and crisis alpha strategies.

References

External links
 

Hedge fund firms in the United Kingdom
Alternative investment management companies
Knightsbridge
Financial services companies established in 2005
2005 establishments in England